Mental health in Australia has been through a significant shift in the last 50 years, with 20% of Australians experiencing one or more mental health episodes in their lifetimes. Australia runs on a mixed health care system, with both public and private health care streams. The public system includes a government run insurance scheme called Medicare, which itself aids towards mental health schemes. Each state within Australia have their own management plans for mental health treatment, however, the overarching system and spending remains the same.

Australia has been noted as being a ‘leader’ in mental health policy making and management. Australia has gone through a rigorous process towards making their mental health policies, with a rich history and a series of changes.

History
Australia has a recorded history of a British system of managing mental health since the first fleet arrived in 1788. When the convicts arrived, all those deemed ‘insane’ were placed in a locked area. Australia had its first psychiatric facility in 1811. Previously individuals with mental illnesses were placed together with convicts and criminals. With the introduction of a psychiatric facility, the mentally disturbed were managed separately.

One of the key moments in Australia’s history with mental health, was its so-called deinstitutionalisation in NSW. This came about after the Richmond Report was released in 1983. This report investigated the rumours of abuse and injustices towards the patients of psychiatric institutions. Controversies over whether or not the change did any good remain.

The first National Mental Health Care Plan was introduced in 1992. There have been five national mental health care plans. The Fifth National Mental Health and Suicide Prevention Plan (Fifth Plan) was endorsed by the COAG Health Council in August 2017.

Current
Despite the fact that Australia has been celebrated for its sophisticated mental health management systems, there are still are wide range of issues. The Australian Medical Association reported in the 2018 mental health review that “Currently Australia lacks an overarching mental health ‘architecture’. There is no agreed national design or structure that facilitates prevention or proper care for people with mental illness.”  While the organisation noted that youth mental health care was fairly successful, it believed that the status of treatment for adults was severely lacking. The AMA argued that the Australian government lacked a structural plan for mental health management and that the future of mental health treatment in Australia was in a dangerous position.

The Australian government spent $9.1 billion on mental health related services in 2017. This averaged out to $375 per person, a rise from $359 in the year prior. In 2016-2017, 7.4% of the Australian government's health expenditure went towards mental health services. Critics have requested an increase in funding, claiming that the mental health budget is far too small. In 2015, mental health accounted for 5.2% of the overall yearly health budgeting, although mental health equated to 12% of the total burden of disease.

Demographics

It is estimated that 45% of Australian, roughly 8.6 million, adults will experience a mental disorder within their life. Additionally, 3.2 million Australians have had a mental disorder that has lasted for more than 12 months. The most prevalent mental disorders were: anxiety disorders, affective disorders and substance use disorders. 14.4% of Australia’s population suffered from these, more common in females. Affective disorders followed with, 6.2% of Australia’s population with an equally distributed gender balance. Substance use disorders affected 5.1% of the population, with men being significantly higher (7.7% for males and 3.3% for females). The Australian Health and Wellbeing Institute reported in 2015 that 14% (560,000) of children and adolescents experienced mental health disorders.

In terms of other mental disorders, Bipolar 1 Disorder has been estimated to affect about 1% of the general public and Bipolar 11 Disorder  affects roughly 5% of the population. Bipolar Disorder affects 33% of men in their lifetime. However, experts estimate the number is far higher due to a large portion of undiagnosed cases. Mood disorders have been noted to affect females more than men,  with 7.1% and 5.3% respectively.

The Mental Health Services 2018 Report released by the Australian Institute of Health and Welfare produced a wide spectrum of new statistics about the Australian population. Four point two million people or 16.5% of the population received mental health related prescriptions during 2017-2018, Seventy per cent of the prescriptions were for antidepressant medications. Tasmania had the highest proportion of those prescriptions at 22%; the smallest proportion was the Northern Territory at 9%.

In terms of general practice (GP), 12.4% of all consultations were mental health related in 2015-2016.  Depression was reported to be the most common mental health related diagnosis, estimated at 1 in 3 people. Medication was the most common treatment recommendation with 61% of encounters.

Additionally, reports released by the Australian Health and Wellbeing Institute found that 1 in 3 Indigenous people experience high or very high levels of psychological distress. Indigenous individuals are managed by general practitioners at a rate of 1.3 times in comparison with other Australian individuals.

The prevalence of both depression and perinatal depression within the population of mothers in Australia has been noted by health organisations as rather high, with depression seen in 20% of mothers with children aged 24 months or less. Perinatal Depression was found in half of that group. These figures equate to 110,000 mothers with depression and 56,000 with perinatal depression. The report found that a majority of mothers went for treatment from a GP or a mental health organisation/treatment provider.

Suicide

In 2015 suicides reached a 13 year high with 3,027 Australians taking their own life.  "The male suicide rate ranged from a high of 5.6 times that of females in 1930 to lows of less than twice the female rate in the 1960s and early 1970s—mainly due to the marked rise in female suicide rates at this time. Since then, the male suicide rate has fluctuated around 3–4 times that of the female rate". It is the number one cause of death of people aged 15 to 44. The Australian Bureau of Statistics reports that nearly eight people commit suicide in Australia each day.

Treatment
In the last ten years, Australia has made a range of improvements towards treatment for mental health. In 2006, Medicare adapted the benefits schedule to prioritise mental health treatment, with a large increase in the portion of treatment plans prescribed. There were 1.3 million mental health treatment plans prescribed by general practitioners and 4.95 million by psychologist related services. The proportion of individuals that sought out mental health treatment doubled between 1997 and 2007.

Australia’s key strategy in mental health planning comes down to: first point of contact. Mental health care providers and treaters are focused making the first point of contact the most significant/impactful. Hence, the main recommendation offered by government health organisations, is for the patient to visit their general practitioner. The aim of this is to prevent further harm or damage coming to the patient and to be able to create a personalised mental health treatment plan for the individual patient.

Government supported treatment providers

Head to Health
Head to Health is an online and hotline service designed to assist individuals struggling with mental health issues; all responders are trained health professionals. Head to Health also has provided over 408 resources for individuals that are struggling, including websites, online programs, apps, forums and the hotline services.

At Ease
At Ease is an organisation aimed at helping veterans and families of veterans with mental trauma, providing assistance and resources. At Ease is managed by the Department of Veterans’ Affairs (DVA) and runs a range of online programs to meet different individuals needs.

Beyond Blue
Beyond Blue is an organisation that works with individuals struggling from a wide range of mental health issues, mainly: substance abuse disorders, depression disorders and anxiety related disorders. Beyond Blue aims to educate the Australian public about mental health and provide the skills to protect it. The mission statement of Beyond Blue is as follows "We're here for everyone in Australia – at work, home, school, university, online, and in communities across the country."
Beyond Blue operates their helpline 24/7 and provides a brief 20 minute consultation for anyone.

Headspace
Headspace is aimed at aiding adolescents (12–25 year olds) with issues surrounding mental health. Headspace offers counselling services as the main point of treatment. A key focus  is early intervention, to prevent mental illness having a long lasting impact on an individual's life. Headspace is one of Australia’s leading mental health organisations, with over 100 locations across the country, all of which are either free or low cost. Headspace has also launched a further initiative focused on aiding students - Headspace Student Support, .

KidsMatter
KidsMatter is a mental health organisation focused on preventing problems and supporting children's mental health. Their vision is as follows "every learning community is positive, inclusive and resilient – a place where every child, young person, educator and family can achieve their best possible mental health."

Lifeline Australia
Lifeline is Australia's main suicide prevention hotline and is a registered charity, providing support services and accepting calls 24/7. Lifeline receives a new call every minute from somewhere in Australia. Individuals call Lifeline about a range of mental health problems including: anxiety, stress, depression and suicidal thoughts. The main Lifeline number is: 13 11 14

Health Direct
Health Direct serves as a portal providing information about Australia's health services and general information about illnesses.  Under the Mental Health disorders sub-category, Health Direct links to a range of other Australian organisations designed to cover a wide range of patient needs.

National Mental Health Commission
National Mental Health Commission is an organisation that reports on the current status of Australia's mental health support system.  The National Mental Health Commission's mission statement "is to give mental health and suicide prevention national attention, to influence reform and to help people live contributing lives by reporting, advising and collaborating."

OzHelp Foundation 
OzHelp Foundation is a non-profit organisation aimed at industry and workplaces, focused on preventing mental illness and improving mental wellbeing of employees. The mission of the OzHelp Foundation is: "OzHelp continue to strive towards improving the mental health and wellbeing of people in the workforce and the wider community."

See also
 Mental health
 Health care in Australia
 Suicide in Australia

References

 
Australia